The 1993 Women's Hockey Champions Trophy was the 4th edition of the Hockey Champions Trophy for women, a field hockey tournament held every four years. It was held between 22 and 29 August 1993 in Amstelveen, Netherlands.

Australia won the tournament for the second consecutive time after defeating the Netherlands 4–2 in the final on penalty strokes after a 1–1 draw.

Squads

Head Coach: Ric Charlesworth

Justine Sowry (GK)
Tammy Ghisalberti
Liane Tooth
Alyson Annan
Juliet Haslam
Jenn Morris
Alison Peek
Lisa Powell
Karen Marsden (GK)
Kate Starre
Sally Carbon
Jackie Pereira
Nova Peris-Kneebone
Rechelle Hawkes (c)
Sharon Buchanan
Michelle Andrews

Head Coach: Rüdiger Hanel

Bianca Weiß (GK)
Birgit Beyer (GK)
Ilhelm Merabet
Susanne Müller
Nadine Ernsting-Krienke
Simone Thomaschinski
Irina Kuhnt
Melanie Cremer
Franziska Hentschel (c)
Inga Möller
Eva Hagenbäumer
Britta Becker
Julia Backhaus
Philippa Suxdorf
Heike Lätzsch
Katrin Kauschke

Head Coach: Sue Slocombe

Tracey Robb (GK)
Hilary Rose (GK)
Mandy Davies
Jane Smith
Lucy Youngs
Jill Atkins (c)
Watkin Lynda
Samantha Wright
Sally Gibson
Alison Swindlehurst
Christine Cook
Pauline Robertson
Gill Messenger
Susan Fraser
Kathryn Johnson
Susan MacDonald

Head Coach: Bert Wentink

Carina Bleeker (GK)
Daphne Touw (GK)
Machteld Derks
Willemijn Duyster
Ingeborg Evenblij
Jeannette Lewin
Hanneke Smabers
Harriët Dijsselhof-Groten
Liesbeth van Gent
Mieketine Wouters
Ingrid Appels
Wendy Fortuin
Noor Holsboer (c)
Cécile Vinke
Frederiek Grijpma
Suzan van der Wielen

Head Coach: Kim Chang-back

You Jae-sook (GK)
Lee Soon-mi
Cho Eun-jung
Ro Min-ha
Lee Seon-young
Kim Myung-ok
Lee Eun-young
Lee Ji-young
Choi Eun-kyung
Jang Dong-sook
Ro Young-mi (c)
Kwon Soon-hyun
Shin Yoo-ri
Lee Kui-joo
Kwon Chang-sook
Jin Deok-san (GK)

Head Coach: José Brasa

Elena Carrión (GK)
Erdoitza Goichoechea
Virginia Ramírez (c)
María Carmen Barea
Ivet Imbers
Elixabete Yarza
María Ángeles Rodríguez
Sonia Barrio
María Cruz González
Rosario Teva
Carmen Martín
Felisa Melero
Begoña Larzabal
Fatima Lasso
Sonia de Ignacio-Simo
María Isabel Martínez (GK)

Results

Pool

Classification

Fifth and sixth place

Third and fourth place

Final

Statistics

Final standings

Goalscorers

References

External links
Official FIH website

Women's Hockey Champions Trophy
Champions Trophy
Hockey Champions Trophy Women
International women's field hockey competitions hosted by the Netherlands
Sports competitions in Amstelveen
Hockey Champions Trophy Women